Hans Tibulski (22 February 1909 – 25 August 1976) was a German international footballer.

References

1909 births
1976 deaths
Association football forwards
German footballers
Germany international footballers
FC Schalke 04 players